Hama Amirou Ly (born December 31, 1946, in Sebba) is a Burkinabé politician and the Mayor of Sebba. He is a member of the Party for Democracy and Socialism.

References

1946 births
Living people
Mayors of places in Burkina Faso
Party for Democracy and Socialism politicians
People from Sahel Region
21st-century Burkinabé people